H44 or H-44 may refer to:
 H-44 (Michigan county highway)
 , a 1919 British Royal Navy H-class submarine
 , a World War II British Royal Navy H-class destroyer
 Nelson H-44, an aircraft engine
 H-44, the last of Nazi Germany's H-class battleship proposals